Ebony Salmon (born 27 January 2001) is an English professional footballer who plays as a forward for NWSL club Houston Dash and the England women's national team.

A product of the Aston Villa academy, Salmon has previously played senior football for Aston Villa, Sheffield United, and Bristol City, and has captained England at under-17 level.

Club career

Aston Villa 
After three years in the Aston Villa academy, Salmon joined the first team in the WSL 2 for the 2017–18 season.

On 8 October 2017, Salmon made her debut in a 2–1 defeat at Sheffield. A month later, she scored her first goal for the club in a 4–0 victory against Watford. On 5 November, Salmon scored in a 2–2 WSL Cup draw against Sheffield, before being dismissed in the final minute of the match.

She scored her first brace for the club in a 3–3 draw against the London Bees on 7 January 2018, and went on to score in three consecutive games in April. Salmon scored a total of seven goals in 12 league games, despite her team finishing second from bottom in the table and winning just three of their 18 games.

Manchester United 

On 1 July 2018, Salmon joined the newly-formed Manchester United to compete in the FA Women's Championship. On 4 January 2019, Salmon moved to fellow Championship side Sheffield United on loan until the end of the season having not yet made her United debut. She was released at the end of the season having not made an appearance for the club.

Loan to Sheffield United 

On 6 January 2019, she made her league debut for Sheffield United, as a 52nd minute substitute for Chloe Dixon, in their 2–1 defeat by Tottenham Hotspur. On 27 January, Salmon scored her first goal for the club, converting a 90th minute penalty in Sheffield United's 2–3 defeat by Charlton Athletic in the Women's Championship. She scored her second brace of the season on 11 May in a 6–0 win over Millwall.

Bristol City 
On 15 July 2019, Salmon signed with Bristol City ahead of the 2019–20 FA WSL season. She made her debut on the opening day of the season on 7 September 2019, in a 0–0 home draw against Brighton & Hove Albion. Salmon scored the only goal in a 1–0 away win against former club Manchester United to secure Bristol City's first win of the season on 5 January 2020. Salmon was Bristol City's highest goalscorer for the 2019–20 season, scoring five league goals and eight in all competitions as Bristol City avoided relegation after finishing the curtailed season in 10th place on points-per-game. She repeated the feat the following season, scoring 10 goals in all competitions including six in the league. However, Bristol City finished bottom and were relegated. On 13 May 2021, the club announced Salmon would be leaving in the summer upon the expiration of her contract.

Racing Louisville 
Following her departure from Bristol City, it was announced on the same day that Salmon had signed a two-year contract with NWSL expansion franchise Racing Louisville. She made her debut as a 71st-minute substitute on 20 June and scored the only goal 74 seconds after coming on (34 seconds after the game restarted) in a 1–0 win over Houston Dash. In her debut season Salmon finished as the team's highest league goalscorer with six goals in 20 appearances, and second on the team for goals in all competitions behind Cece Kizer on seven.

Houston Dash 
Under new coach Kim Björkegren in 2022, Salmon's playing time at Racing Louisville declined. Louisville's general manager James O'Connor broached the prospect of a trade to Salmon, who had considered requesting one. The team subsequently traded her on 27 June 2022 to Houston Dash in exchange for up to $190,000 of allocation money depending on her results in Houston, a fee that set a Louisville club record. Upon arriving, the Dash signed Salmon to a one-year contract extension through 2023, and Salmon remarked in an interview that she would be "taking my anger from not playing in Louisville and I'm going to show what I can do here when I get on the pitch."

International career

Youth 
On 28 April 2017, Salmon made her debut for England Under-17s in a 2–0 defeat to the United States. In her third appearance for the national team, she scored both of her country's goals in a 6–2 defeat in the United States after coming on as a half-time substitute. Salmon also scored in the following match, a 10–0 victory against Latvia, and added two goals in 6–0 win against Slovakia in October 2017 to help qualify for the UEFA Women's U17 Championship.

In May 2018, Salmon captained England at the tournament. After scoring in a 2–1 defeat to Spain, Salmon scored a hat-trick in 18 minutes against Italy to secure a place in the knockout rounds. She appeared in the semi-final and third-place fixtures as England finished the tournament in fourth.

Senior 
In February 2021, Salmon received her first senior international call-up as a late addition to Hege Riise's first squad as interim England manager. She made her debut on 23 February as an 84th minute substitute for Rachel Daly in a 6–0 friendly win against Northern Ireland.

Career statistics

Club

International
Statistics accurate as of match played 19 February 2023.

Honours 
England

 Arnold Clark Cup: 2023

References

External links 
 
 

2001 births
Living people
English women's footballers
England women's international footballers
Women's association football forwards
Women's Championship (England) players
Women's Super League players
National Women's Soccer League players
Aston Villa W.F.C. players
Manchester United W.F.C. players
Sheffield United W.F.C. players
Bristol City W.F.C. players
Racing Louisville FC players
Houston Dash players
Expatriate women's soccer players in the United States
English expatriate sportspeople in the United States
Black British sportswomen